Lakshman Jagannath Vaidya was the Dewan Bahadur of Baroda. He was the brother of Narayan Jagannath Vaidya. He belonged to the CKP community of Maharashtra. He also started a scholarship for the CKP students in 1887.

References

Marathi people
People from Maharashtra